is a town located in Akita Prefecture, Japan. , the town had an estimated population of 19,337 in 6632 households  and a population density of 119 persons per km².

Geography
Misato is located at the far southeastern of Akita Prefecture, bordered by the Ōu Mountains and Iwate Prefecture to the east.

Neighboring municipalities
Akita Prefecture
Daisen
Yokote
Iwate Prefecture
Nishiwaga

Climate
Misato has a Humid continental climate (Köppen climate classification Cfa) with large seasonal temperature differences, with warm to hot (and often humid) summers and cold (sometimes severely cold) winters. Precipitation is significant throughout the year, but is heaviest from August to October.  The average annual temperature in Misato is 14.3 °C. The average annual rainfall is 1743 mm with September as the wettest month. The temperatures are highest on average in August, at around 26.3 °C, and lowest in January, at around -3.8 °C.

Demographics
Per Japanese census data, the population of Misato peaked at around the year 1960 and has been in steady decline since then.

History
The area of present-day Misato was part of ancient Dewa Province, dominated by the Satake clan during the Edo period, who ruled Kubota Domain under the Tokugawa shogunate.  The area was organized into six villages within Semboku District, Akita with the establishment of the modern municipalities system on April 1, 1889. The village of Rokugō was raised to town status in 1891. The town of Misato was established on November 1, 2004, from the merger of the towns of Senhata and Rokugō, with the village of Sennan.

Economy
The economy of Misato is based on agriculture and forestry.  Rice is the primary cash crop. Industries are centered around food processing, with sake brewing and  fermented foods made from soybeans such as natto, miso, and soy sauce predominant.

Education
Misato has three public elementary schools and one public middle school operated by the town government. The town has one public high school operated by the Akita Prefectural Board of Education.

Transportation

Railway
 East Japan Railway Company - Ōu Main Line
  -

Highway

Sister city relations
 – Ruisui, Hualien, Taiwan (friendship city)

Local attractions
Hotta-no-saku, National Historic Site

Noted people from Misato
Kosugi Tengai,  author

References

External links

Official Website 

 
Towns in Akita Prefecture